Donnel A. Thompson (born February 17, 1978) is a former American football linebacker in the National Football League (NFL). He played for the Pittsburgh Steelers (2000) and the Indianapolis Colts (2001–2003). He played College football at the University of Wisconsin–Madison.

See also
 List of Pittsburgh Steelers players

References

1978 births
Living people
American football linebackers
Indianapolis Colts players
Pittsburgh Steelers players
Wisconsin Badgers football players
Sportspeople from Madison, Wisconsin
Players of American football from Wisconsin
Madison West High School alumni